Edward Lametek Adamu is a Nigerian quantity surveyor, business consultant and leadership strategist. He is the Deputy Governor of the Central Bank of Nigeria, the country's central bank. He was nominated to that position by president Muhammadu Buhari on 1 February 2018, to replace Suleiman Barau, who retired in December 2017. He was unanimously confirmed by the Nigerian Senate on 22 March 2018.

Immediately prior to his appointment to his current position, he served as the Director of Human Resources at the Central bank of Nigeria, since 2016. Adamu is also currently serving as the Chairman of Asset Management Company of Nigeria (AMCON).

Background and education
Edward Adamu was born on 22 June 1959 in Kaltungo, Gombe State, in the northeastern part of Nigeria. He studied at the Ahmadu Bello University, in Zaria, graduating with a Bachelor of Science in Quantity Surveying. He also holds postgraduate professional qualifications from other institutions of higher learning, including the Institute of Credit Administration of Nigeria, the Wharton School, INSEAD, Booth School of Business and IMD Switzerland. He is also a fellow of the Nigerian Institute of Quantity Surveyors.

Work history
Adamu was first employed at the Central Bank of Nigeria (CBN), in 1992. In 2012, he was appointed Director of the Strategy Management Department at the central bank. During the intervening years, he served in many roles and in many departments at CBN, including Knowledge Management, Records Management, Strategic Alliance and Price Intelligence. He also served as the head of the Projects Planning & Implementation Division.

In 2016, Adamu was appointed Director of Human Resources at CBN, a position he occupied prior to his appointment as CBN Deputy Governor.

On the 9th of December, 2019, President Muhammadu Buhari nominated Edward Adamu as the new Chairman of Asset Management Company of Nigeria (AMCON), a role he took over from Muiz Banire.

Personal details
Edward Lametek Adamu is a married father of four children (two boys and two girls).

See also
Central Bank of Nigeria
Godwin Emefiele
Aishah Ahmad
List of banks in Nigeria
 Muhammad Bima Enagi
 M.K. Nuhu-Koko

References

External links
 Website of the Central Bank of Nigeria
 Website of Amcon Nigeria

Living people
Nigerian civil servants
1959 births
Nigerian bankers
People from Gombe State
Ahmadu Bello University alumni
INSEAD alumni
University of Chicago Booth School of Business alumni
Wharton School of the University of Pennsylvania alumni